Sandhu or Sindhu is a clan or family name found among the Jats in India and Pakistan. It is Punjab's second largest Jat clan. The clan is also found in the state of Haryana.

The etymology is connected to the word Sindhu, the native name for the Indus river.

Notable people with the surname, who may or may not be affiliated to the clan, include:

Baba Deep Singh (1682–1757), Sikh martyr
Banita Sandhu, British-Indian actress
Bhai Bala (1466–1544), a companion of Guru Nanak
Bhagat Singh (1907-1931), Saheed-e-Azam, Indian revolutionary
Garry Sandhu (born 1984), Indian singer, lyricist, actor and owner of label Fresh Media Records
Gurbaksh Singh Sandhu, former national boxing coach, India
Gurinder Sandhu (born 1993), Indian-Australian professional cricketer
Gurpreet Singh Sandhu (born 1992), Indian international goalkeeper
Harnaaz Sandhu, Miss India 2021 and Miss Universe 2021
Harpreet Sandhu (actor) (born 1979), Indian actor, director, writer, music director, editor, cinematographer and poet
Harrdy Sandhu (born 1986), Indian singer and actor
Heera Singh Sandhu (1706-1767), founder of the Nakai Misl
Jaswinder Singh Sandhu (general), military secretary, Indian army
Jinny Sandhu, British-Indian professional wrestler
Jordan Sandhu, Indian singer and actor
Kamaljeet Sandhu, Indian athlete
Khalil Tahir Sandhu, Pakistani politician
Manavjit Singh Sandhu (born 1976), Indian sport shooter and three-time Olympian
Nandish Sandhu, Indian model and television actor
Nashra Sandhu, Pakistani cricketer
Nick Sandhu (born 1962), Indian field hockey player
Paige Sandhu, British-Indian actress
Peter Sandhu, Indo-Canadian politician and Member of the Legislative Assembly of Alberta 
Sahil Sandhu (born 1991), Indo-Canadian soccer player 
Surinder Sandhu, Indian sarangi player and composer
Taranjit Singh Sandhu, Indian ambassador to United States
Tommy Sandhu (born 1976), British-Indian DJ, remixer, producer and television presenter
Vattan Sandhu, Indian Punjabi singer and actor
Yasir Zafar Sindhu, Pakistani politician

References

Punjab
Jat clans of Pakistan
Social groups of Punjab, India
Punjabi tribes
Indian surnames
Hindu surnames
Social groups of Haryana
Punjabi-language surnames